The 1981 Campionati Internazionali di Sicilia, also known as the Sicilian Grand Prix, was a men's tennis tournament played on outdoor clay courts in Palermo, Italy that was part of the 1981 Volvo Grand Prix. It was the third edition of the tournament and took place from 14 September until 20 September 1981. Unseeded Manuel Orantes won the singles title.

Finals

Singles
 Manuel Orantes defeated  Pedro Rebolledo 6–4, 6–0, 6–0
 It was Orantes' 1st singles title of the year and the 35th of his career.

Doubles
 José Luis Damiani /  Diego Pérez defeated  Jaime Fillol /  Belus Prajoux 6–1, 6–4

References

External links
 ITF tournament edition details

Campionati Internazionali di Sicilia
Campionati Internazionali di Sicilia
Campionati Internazionali di Sicilia